Starrer (foaled April 2, 1998 in Kentucky) is an American millionaire Thoroughbred racemare who was purchased as a yearling for $35,000 by George Krikorian, a Southern California movie theater mogul and member of the California Horse Racing Board.

Trained by David Hofmans throughout 2001, in the spring of 2002 Krikorian replaced him with John Shirreffs.

Starrer was retired from racing having won five graded stakes including the Grade 1 Santa Margarita Invitational and Santa Maria Handicaps.
  George Krikorian kept Starrer to serve as a broodmare. Her offspring met with only modest success on the track.

Pedigree

References

1998 racehorse births
Racehorses bred in Kentucky
Racehorses trained in the United States
Thoroughbred family 4-r